The 1946 WANFL season was the 62nd season of senior football in Perth, Western Australia.

With the background of the Pacific War almost entirely removed, the WANFL entered a period of exceptional growth that was to last until the middle 1960s. Attendances reached levels never seen in the pre-war WANFL, highlighted by two record crowds between grand finalists East Fremantle and West Perth. The league also restored the seconds competition, which had been placed into recess in 1941, as a “colts” competition for players under 25.

1946 is most famous for Old Easts’ feat of a perfect season, winning all twenty-one of its matches to finish the season with a winning streak of thirty-one consecutive games, easily the longest in the history of the competition. 

There was a controversy in the third-last round when East Fremantle played Subiaco and, owing to a number of injuries, played colts wingman Harry Townsend in the league team, although regulations did not permit a colts player to start in the league team on the same day: a protest by Subiaco was dismissed on a technicality. Old Easts’ perfect season was only slightly marred by losing to third-placed VFL club Collingwood in an exhibition match at Subiaco Oval on October 15.

1946 also saw Perth, who had been in the doldrums since the end of World War I, begin its rise to power with the return of Merv McIntosh. The Redlegs stood third with two games remaining but lost a decisive match to Subiaco, who played open-age finals for the first time in a decade, in spite of being very weak in attack and the failure of their protest against Townsend. 

Swan Districts, who had reached the finals in 1945, fell to second-last place and began its bleakest period on record, as well as one of the bleakest in elite Australian rules football history: until Haydn Bunton, Jr. joined the club in 1961, Swans were never to win more than seven games in a season, with a winning percentage of a mere 20.43% in 1945-1960, and would also win seven wooden spoons in that time, never finishing higher than sixth on the ladder: Subiaco and Claremont also had similar periods of futility in that time, albeit to a lesser extent than Swans. Despite this, Swans won their first premiership of any kind in the seconds competition. 

Despite the return of Bernie Naylor, who went far beyond his 1941 promise with 131 goals, South Fremantle fell to fourth owing to injuries and business commitments, one of which caused their coach to resign while their form was at its best.

Perth and West Perth toured Sydney and Melbourne respectively during the first three weeks of August, and played each other four times during the season.

Home-and-away season

Round 1

Round 2

Round 3

Round 4

Round 5

Round 6 (Foundation Day)

Round 7 (King’s Birthday)

Round 8

Round 9

Round 10

Round 11

Round 12

Round 13

Round 14

Round 15

Round 16

Round 17

Round 18

Round 19

Ladder

Finals

First semi-final

Second semi-final

Preliminary final

Grand Final

Collingwood Tour Match

Notes
A few significant players such as Ray Scott, Fred Buttsworth and Tim Barker remained in the forces until 1947, whilst some others such as Ray Schofield returned while the season was ongoing.No other senior WANFL team until 2018 when Subiaco did it had ever achieved even a perfect home-and-away season, though East Perth in the under-age competition of 1944 equalled the feat of East Fremantle in 1946. Since 1901, the only other clubs with one loss in a season have been Claremont in 1987 and Subiaco in 2008, 2017 and 2019.The intervening 948-game gap constitutes the longest non-occurrence of draws in any major Australian Rules competition.

References

External links
Official WAFL website
Western Australian National Football League (WANFL), 1946

West Australian Football League seasons
WANFL